"I'm a Survivor" is a song by country music artist George Jones, released in 1988.  Composed by Jim McBride and Keith Stegall, the song references Jones' own hard-living past, including his drinking and arrests, but vowing, "As long as I'm breathin', you ain't heard the last of me yet."  Despite the song's theme of resilience, the single bombed on the charts, peaking at #52—the first time since 1962 a George Jones solo single missed the top 40 on the Billboard country charts.   Jones performed the song during a television special celebrating the twentieth anniversary of Hee Haw in 1988.

Chart performance

References

Year of song missing
Songs written by Keith Stegall
Songs written by Jim McBride (songwriter)
Song recordings produced by Billy Sherrill
Epic Records singles
George Jones songs